Charles Mrazovich (February 26, 1924 – November 8, 2020) was an American professional basketball player. Mrazovich was selected in the third round of the 1950 NBA draft by the Indianapolis Olympians after a collegiate career at Eastern Kentucky. He died in November 2020 at the age of 96.

References

External links
Eastern Kentucky University Hall of Fame entry

1924 births
2020 deaths
American Basketball League (1925–1955) players
American men's basketball players
Basketball players from Pennsylvania
College men's track and field athletes in the United States
Eastern Kentucky Colonels men's basketball players
Forwards (basketball)
High school basketball coaches in the United States
Indianapolis Olympians draft picks
Indianapolis Olympians players
People from Ambridge, Pennsylvania
Wilkes-Barre Barons players